Freeway No.7 of the Republic of China is a planned freeway in Kaohsiung City in Taiwan. The freeway will connect the Kaohsiung Port to Freeway 10 (Kaohsiung Branch) along the eastern suburbs of Kaohsiung. As of 2015, the freeway is still under review from the environmental agencies.

External links
 國道7號高雄路段計畫 (in Chinese)

Freeway No. 07